William Donald Cox (June 23, 1913 – February 16, 1988) was an American politician and professional baseball pitcher.

Baseball career
Cox played all or part of five seasons in Major League Baseball, from 1936 until 1940, for the St. Louis Cardinals, Chicago White Sox and St. Louis Browns. He also officiated at high school and college basketball games and at the Illinois State High School Finals in Champaign, Illinois.

Political career
Cox served in the United States Army during World War II. He served on the Coles County, Illinois School Board Unit No. One from 1954 to 1958. He also served as sheriff of Coles County from 1958 to 1962 and as treasurer of Coles County from 1962 to 1966. Cox was a Republican. Cox served in the Illinois House of Representatives from 1967 to 1973.

Indictment, conviction, and resignation
On September 26, 1973, Cox pleaded guilty in the United States District Court to mail fraud and filing a false income tax return. United States District Court judge Harlington Wood Jr. presided over the trial. On November 1, 1973, Cox resigned from the Illinois General Assembly; he was also sentenced to fifteen months in prison for a scheme to defraud the state of Illinois and for filing  a false income tax return.

References

External links

Major League Baseball pitchers
St. Louis Cardinals players
Chicago White Sox players
St. Louis Browns players
Hutchinson Larks players
Bloomington Bloomers players
Columbus Red Birds players
St. Paul Saints (AA) players
San Antonio Missions players
Toledo Mud Hens players
Indianapolis Indians players
Baseball players from Illinois
1913 births
1988 deaths
People from Coles County, Illinois
Military personnel from Illinois
Illinois sheriffs
School board members in Illinois
Republican Party members of the Illinois House of Representatives
Illinois politicians convicted of crimes
20th-century American politicians
United States Army personnel of World War II